R Govardhanam (21 February 1928 – 18 September 2017)  was an Indian composer who worked in the Tamil, Hindi, Kannada Malayalam, Telugu and Sinhala film industry. He sometimes collaborated with his brother, composer R. Sudarsanam.

Filmography

References 

Indian musicians
Tamil film score composers
Telugu film score composers
Kannada film score composers
Tamil musicians
20th-century Indian musicians
Malayalam film score composers
Indian male film score composers
20th-century male musicians
2017 deaths
1918 births